The Kaohsiung Cultural Center is a cultural center located in Lingya District of Kaohsiung, Taiwan. It was founded by the city government in 1981. The main building of the center is a complex of two concert halls, many galleries, and a library. The office of Kaohsiung Bureau of Cultural Affairs is also located in Kaohsiung Cultural Center.

History
The cultural center was originally built as a memorial hall for Chiang Kai-shek; its former name was Kaohsiung Chiang Kai-shek Cultural Center (高雄市立中正文化中心). The memorial function was abolished by the city government in 2007, and the name was then changed to the current name.

Structure
The main building is 13,884 m2, the main audience hall located in the center called Jhihde Hall (至德堂) seats an audience of 1672. This hall is the cultural center for Kaohsiung city. The next largest hall Jhihshan Hall (至善廳) seats 483 people, this hall is available for other performances, rehearsals and speech. There are also Chih-Chen Hall (至真堂) and Chih-Mei Galleries (至美軒), for artists and students.

Notable events
 Golden Horse Film Festival and Awards (18th, 20th, 22nd, 33rd, 39th)

Transportation
The cultural center is accessible within walking distance South from Cultural Center Station of the Kaohsiung MRT.

See also
 List of museums in Taiwan
 List of tourist attractions in Taiwan

References

External links

Official site (Kaohsiung Bureau of Cultural Affairs)

1981 establishments in Taiwan
Cultural centers in Kaohsiung
Lingya District